Abraham Tobias Boas (25 November 1842 – 20 February 1923) was a rabbi of a Hebrew congregation in Adelaide, South Australia.

Biography

Early life
Abraham Tobias Boas was born at Amsterdam, the Netherlands, son of Tobias Eliesar Boas, rabbi, and his wife Eva Salomon Levi, née Linse. Boas was educated at Amsterdam Theological Seminary and studied theology under a well-known Hebraist, Delaville. In 1865, he went to England to further his studies, and in 1867 became minister to the Jewish congregation at Southampton.

Adult life in Australia
In 1869, he was chosen as rabbi for the congregation at Adelaide, South Australia, and he arrived there on the ship Tamesa, Capt. William O. Phillips, from Liverpool on 13 February 1870. He held the position for forty-eight years, and became a well-known figure in all movements intended to forward the cultural and material good of the community . Well read, a great student of William Shakespeare, urbane and kind, broad-minded and anxious to be of use to other denominations than his own, he was a welcome visitor to the YMCA, and often lectured on aspects of Jewish life and Old Testament history. He not only earned the affection of his own congregation, he was generally recognized as a valuable and public-spirited citizen. He resigned his charge in 1918 in consequence of a stroke from which he never fully recovered.

Personal life
On 15 May 1873 he married Elizabeth Solomon (c. 1851 – 26 September 1916), a daughter of Isaac Solomon (1818–1901) of Adelaide's influential Solomon family, and was survived by four sons, including Lionel (1875–1949) and Harold (1883–1980), and five daughters.

Death
He died on 20 February 1923 and was buried in West Terrace Cemetery.

References

Louise Rosenberg, 'Boas, Abraham Tobias (1842 - 1923)', Australian Dictionary of Biography, Volume 7, MUP, 1979, pp 331–332. 

1844 births
1923 deaths
Australian rabbis
Dutch emigrants to Australia
Rabbis from Amsterdam
Burials at West Terrace Cemetery